During the 2001–02 season, Sunderland competed in the FA Premier League.

Season summary
In the 2001–02 season, despite standing 9th on Boxing Day 2001, Sunderland narrowly avoided relegation. They were the lowest scoring team in the Premier League, with  29 goals, ending the season in 17th place and being knocked out of both English Cup competitions in their first rounds.

Results
Sunderland's score comes first

Legend

FA Premier League

League table

Results per matchday

FA Cup

League Cup

Players

First-team squad
Squad at end of season

Left club during season

Reserves
The following players did not appear for the first team this season.

Transfers

In

Out

Loan in

Loan out

Statistics

Appearances and goals
As of end of season

|-
! colspan=14 style=background:#dcdcdc; text-align:center| Goalkeepers
|-

|-
! colspan=14 style=background:#dcdcdc; text-align:center| Defenders
|-

|-
! colspan=14 style=background:#dcdcdc; text-align:center| Midfielders:
|-

|-
! colspan=14 style=background:#dcdcdc; text-align:center| Forwards:
|-

|-
|colspan="14"|Players no longer with club:
|-

|-
|}

Notes

References

Sunderland
Sunderland A.F.C. seasons